South Perth Lions Rugby League Club are an Australian rugby league football club based in South Perth, Western Australia formed in 1948. They conduct teams for both Juniors & Seniors. The club also participates in the WARL (Western Australian Rugby League).

Notable Juniors
Jon Grieve (1991-97 Manly Warringah Sea Eagles & Western Reds)
Luke Goodwin (1992-99 Canterbury, Penrith, Perth Reds & Wests)
Jon Green (2006-13 Cronulla Sharks, St George &  Canterbury)
Bryson Goodwin (2007-20 Cronulla Sharks, South Sydney & Canterbury)
Bronx Goodwin (2007-12 Cronulla Sharks, St George & Canberra)
Cory Paterson (2007-19 Newcastle, North Queensland, Wests Tigers & Toronto Wolfpack)
Kurt De Luis (2021- Manly Sea Eagles)

See also

Rugby league in Western Australia

References

External links
South Peth Lions Fox Sports pulse

Rugby league teams in Western Australia
Sporting clubs in Perth, Western Australia
1948 establishments in Australia
Rugby clubs established in 1948
South Perth, Western Australia